Dzmitry Baskau (Belarusian: Дзмітрый Юр’евіч Баскаў, Russian: Дмитрий Юрьевич Басков; born on August 25, 1978, in Minsk, Byelorussian Soviet Socialist Republic) is a Belarusian former ice hockey player and businessman. He served as chief of Belarusian Ice Hockey Association in 2020—2021. He is the chief of the ice hockey group of Alexander Lukashenko and also the chief of the HC Dinamo Minsk from 2018 to 2020. On 14 September 2021, he was appointed to the Council of the Republic.

Life 
Until 2002 Baskau studied law at Belarusian State University. Then he got learning on an ice hockey coach done in the Institute of Advanced Training and Retraining of Belarusian State University of Physical Culture. He got a diploma from the IPM Business School in 2018. 

He was put in the news for the time of the 2020 Belarusian protests. According to mass media Baskau was among the persons who beat activist Raman Bandarenka in Minsk. After that, Raman Bandarenka died on November 12, 2020, in the hospital. On November 16, 2020, Latvia imposed a travel ban against Baskau and Dmitry Shakuta who is also accused of participating in the attack against Bandarenka. Lithuania and Estonia made the same on November 20, 2020. The International Ice Hockey Federation opened a private inquiry (an act of asking for information) on the Raman Bandarenka matter. The International Olympic Committee banned Baskau of taking part in its events.

In the spring of 2021, he had assets of at least several million US dollars (parts of companies, real property, vehicles). Part of the assets was listed as his wife's.

On September 8, 2021, the International Ice Hockey Federation disqualified him for five years. For ten months, the International Ice Hockey Federation investigated his actions and found that Baskau used discrimination and threats against sportspersons because of their political views. On September 10, Baskau resigned from the post of chairman of the Belarusian Ice Hockey Association.

On September 14, 2021, Alexander Lukashenko appointed Baskau a member of the Council of the Republic of the National Assembly of Belarus. Lukashenko noted that Dmitry Baskau will deal with social issues, as well as sports topics in the upper house of parliament.

On December 2, 2021, Dzmitry Baskau was added to the Specially Designated Nationals and Blocked Persons List by the United States Department of the Treasury

Personal life 
He got married with Aliaksandra Baskava (Shyshko). She is a daughter of the chief of Brestenergo and the member of the Council of the Republic (Belarus) Uladzimir Shyshko.

References 

Belarusian ice hockey players
Members of the Council of the Republic of Belarus
Businesspeople from Minsk
Living people
1978 births
Belarusian individuals subject to the U.S. Department of the Treasury sanctions
Ice hockey people from Minsk